Brit Awards 2008  was the 28th edition of the Brit Awards, an annual music awards ceremony in the United Kingdom. It was organised by the British Phonographic Industry and took place on 20 February 2008 at the Earls Court in London. The ceremony attracted 6.1 million viewers, 800,000 more than the previous live broadcast. Leona Lewis was nominated for four awards but came away empty-handed.

Performances

Winners and Nominees

Outstanding Contribution to Music
Paul McCartney (presented by Kylie Minogue)

Multiple nominations and Awards

Memorable moments

Vic Reeves and Sharon Osbourne
After Vic Reeves appeared to forget which award he was presenting, Sharon Osbourne attempted to wrestle the microphone from him, insisted he was drunk and called him a "pissed bastard". She proceeded to make the full announcement herself. The next day it was reported that Reeves was not intoxicated and was hurt by Osbourne's behaviour. The incident has since been ascribed to an autocue malfunction, but Reeves said in his defence that he was trying to read the autocue screen, but he couldn't read it because Osbourne was pushing him out of the way.

Arctic Monkeys
When the Arctic Monkeys took to the stage to collect their award for 'Best British Album', the band were dressed up in traditional English country and hunting outfits and even took a plastic duck to the stage with them. During the acceptance speech, they made a rude tirade about the Brits school which forced producers to pull it from the television broadcast.

References

External links
Brit Awards 2008 at Brits.co.uk
BBC Radio 1

Brit Awards
Brit Awards
Brit Awards
Brit
Brit Awards
Brit Awards